Butin is a surname of French or Slavic origin (masculine) or Butina (feminine) that may refer to

Édouard Butin (born 1988), French football striker
Jacques Butin (born 1925), French former field hockey player
Maria Butina (born 1988), Russian foreign agent
Roy Butin (1876–1943), American recording artist 
Tomislav Butina (born 1974), Croatian football goalkeeper

French-language surnames
Russian-language surnames